Jesús Noguera Perea (born 3 May 1990) is a professional Spanish darts player who plays in Professional Darts Corporation events.

He won a PDC Tour Card in 2020 after winning 2 Challenge Tour events in 2019, helping him to finish 2nd in the rankings.

References

External links

1990 births
Living people
Spanish darts players
Professional Darts Corporation former tour card holders
PDC World Cup of Darts Spanish team